"When You Leave, Don't Slam the Door" is a country music song written by Joe Allison, performed by Tex Ritter, and released on the Capitol label (catalog no. 296). In October 1946, it reached No. 3 on the Billboard folk chart. It was also ranked as the No. 23 record in Billboard's 1946 year-end folk juke box chart.

See also
 Billboard Most-Played Folk Records of 1946

References

Tex Ritter songs
1946 songs
1946 singles